The Joliet JackHammers were a professional baseball team based in Joliet, Illinois, in the United States. The JackHammers were a member of the Northern League, which is not affiliated with Major League Baseball. From 2002 to 2010, the JackHammers played their home games at Silver Cross Field.

History
Their first season was the 2002 season and the Jackhammers had been preceded in Joliet by the minor league Joliet Convicts, who began play in 1890.  The Jackhammers first playoff appearance came in their first season.

The 2008 Jackhammers were managed by one time Arizona Diamondback managerial candidate Wally Backman. The primary radio announcer was Jon Versteeg.

The Jackhammers, in response to extremely low attendance in 2009, had a total makeover to start the 2010 season. Everything, from the roster and management, all the way down to the uniforms, was re-done. Their offseason advertising campaign was also very aggressive, and included everything from newspaper ads to billboards. The Jackhammers made the playoffs for the first time in 8 years, making the season a success performance-wise. They still lagged in attendance, averaging about 3,500 fans a game, 4th in the league.

Founded: 2002
Playoff appearances: 2002, 2010
Divisional titles won: 2002
League Championships won: None

The team was sold in December 2010 after months of negotiations to Steel City Baseball LLC. Steel City bought all assets to the team seeing as they owed $220,000 to the city. With the sale, none of the unpaid bills will be paid off. Steel City changed the team's name for the 2011 season, and the team joined the Frontier League. On January 12, 2011 GM John Dittrich announced for the 2011 season the new team would be called the Joliet Slammers. The team will continue to use Silver Cross Field as their home venue.

Year-by-year record

Final roster

References
 yearly league standings & awards, nlfan.com
 article on the sale, chicagoist.com

External links
Joliet JackHammers official site
 nlfan.com Joliet JackHammers' Guide

2002 establishments in Illinois
2010 disestablishments in Illinois
Defunct baseball teams in Illinois
Northern League (baseball, 1993–2010) teams
Professional baseball teams in Illinois
Baseball teams established in 2002
Baseball teams disestablished in 2010
Sports teams in Joliet, Illinois
Defunct independent baseball league teams